"Photograph" is a song by American alternative rock group The Verve Pipe, released in February 1996 as the lead single from their debut album, Villains. Although not a mainstream success like their well-known hit "The Freshmen", it reached number 6 on the US Alternative Songs chart, number 17 on the US Mainstream Rock Songs chart, and number 5 on the Canadian rock chart in 1996.

Charts and certifications

Weekly charts

References

1996 singles
The Verve Pipe songs
Song recordings produced by Jerry Harrison
1996 songs
RCA Records singles